Viel is the sixth studio album of the German hip hop group Die Fantastischen Vier. It peaked at No. 2 on the German and Austrian charts and at No. 4 in Switzerland.

Track listing 
"Auf geht's" – 1:05
"Bring it back" – 3:46
"Geboren" – 3:51
"Jede Generation" – 3:42
"Pipis und Popos" – 4:42
"Leben zu zweit" – 3:47
"Sommerregen" – 5:33
"Ewig" – 4:52
"Keine Lösung" – 3:53
"Hey" – 4:04
"Mein Schwert" – 5:44
"Ruf die Polizei" – 3:36
"Troy" (homophonous with Treu – "loyal") – 4:29
"Viel" – 2:26

Singles

External links
 Official website (in German)
 Discography at Discogs

2004 albums
Die Fantastischen Vier albums